The Maybach 57 (chassis no. W240) and 62 (chassis no. V240) were the first automobile models of the Maybach brand since the brand's revival by DaimlerChrysler AG (now Mercedes-Benz Group AG). They are derived from the Mercedes-Benz Maybach concept car presented at the 1997 Tokyo Motor Show. The concept car was based on the Mercedes-Benz W140 S-class sedan platform, as were the production models. The Luxury Brand Status Index 2008 placed the Maybach in first place, ahead of Rolls-Royce and Bentley. The models ceased production in December 2012 due to continued financial losses for the marque, and sales at one-fifth the level of the profitable Rolls-Royce models.

History 
Wilhelm Maybach was an engineer who worked with Gottlieb Daimler to design combustion engines. The first Daimler-Maybach automobile was built in 1889. Over the years, the Maybach name developed into a brand name for automobiles that were typically very large, powerful, and luxurious. For example, the Maybach Zeppelin DS 8 Cabriolet built in 1929 had side sections that could be lowered completely to allow it to be used as a parade car. In 1998, DaimlerChrysler AG's competitor, BMW AG, purchased the ultra-luxury brand Rolls-Royce. The Maybach brand name was reintroduced in 2000 to be a direct challenger to BMW's top vehicle, the Rolls-Royce Phantom.

Design 
Both Maybach models are variants of the same ultra-luxurious automobile. The model numbers reflect the respective lengths of the automobiles in decimetres. The 57 is more likely to be owner-driven, while the longer 62 is designed with a chauffeur in mind.

Features 
Standard features of all models include, but are not limited to: a navigation system with voice recognition; power rear sunshade; rear-seat DVD entertainment system; interior air filter; front and rear seat massage; 21-speaker Bose premium sound system; power tilt/telescopic heated leather-wrapped-wood steering wheel with radio and climate controls; power trunk open/close; voice-activated AM/FM radio with 6-disc CD changer; keyless start; heated front and rear seats; cooled front seats; adaptive cruise control; premium leather upholstery; 18-way power front seats; 14-way power rear seats; heated cupholders; rear beverage refrigerator; rear pop-out folding table trays; rearview camera; pneumatic soft close doors; iPod adapter; wireless cell phone link; outside-temperature indicator; universal garage door opener.

Every Maybach has 2 climate control systems: one for the front compartment and one for the rear. Each can be programmed and operated independently, producing four-zone climate control.

An upgraded version of the Mercedes air suspension system called AirMatic Dual Control is standard, featuring air springs complemented by an additional spring-rate adjustment system with adaptive damping.

Options for the Maybach 62 and 62S include: 18-way power rear seats (replacing 14-way); power side sunshades; cooled rear seats; wireless headphones; electrochromic power panoramic sunroof (replacing power sunroof); steering wheel mounted navigation controls.

The company offered various options for customers to personalize their vehicles, and provided various equipment combinations.

Performance 
The engine in the base Model 57 and 62 is the Mercedes-Benz M285, a 5.5-litre twin-turbo V12 developed specifically for the new Maybach cars. A slightly de-tuned version, denoted M275, was used in the 2003-2006 W220 S600 and CL600 replacing the M137, naturally-aspirated V12, which appears in the 1998-2002 W220 S600 and CL600.

In terms of power output, the 57 and 62 have ; the 57 S and 62 S, ; and the Zeppelin has .

Price 
As of early 2008, European and United States prices were:

 Maybach 57 - $366,934 / €341,750
 Maybach 57 S - $417,402 / €381,250
 Maybach 62 - $431,055 / €392,750
 Maybach 62 S - $492,602 / €432,250
 Maybach Landaulet - $1,350,000 / €900,000

Introduction 
On 26 June 2002 a Maybach 62 enclosed in a glass case on the Queen Elizabeth 2 departed from Southampton, England, en route to New York City, with the media and company officials staying in the luxury suites on board. The ship arrived in New York on 2 July, welcomed by geysering fireboats and a motor boat. A helicopter lifted the car off the liner and onto a dock. It was then driven to the Regent Hotel, Wall Street.

Variants

Maybach 57 

The Maybach 57 is the base designation.

Maybach 57 S 

Daimler revealed the Maybach 57 S at the 2005 Geneva Motor Show, with the S standing for "special". It uses a 6.0-L version of the V12 engine manufactured by Mercedes-AMG. It also rides  lower on 20-inch wheels. The North American unveiling was at the Los Angeles Auto Show in January 2006.

Maybach 57 and 62 "Zeppelin" 

Maybach revealed the "Zeppelin" nameplate at the 2009 Geneva Motor Show as an additional luxury package that could be ordered on both the Maybach 57 and 62. The name "Zeppelin" was also used for the pre-war models Maybach DS7 and Maybach DS8. The package consists of special California beige leather with Stromboli-black stitching, piano black lacquer finishes, and silver "Zeppelin" champagne glasses. Next to the interior changes, the exterior has exclusive 20-in chrome wheels and dark-red taillights. The word 'ZEPPELIN' is also incorporated into the triangular 'M' hood ornament.

Maybach 62 

The Maybach 62 includes many luxury features such as fully reclining rear seats, Maybach four-zone climate control, tinted windows, infrared-reflecting laminated glass all round, AirMATIC dual-control air suspension, display instruments in rear roof liner (showing speed, time, and outside temperature), folding rear tables (left and right), 21-speaker BOSE Surround Everywhere sound system, and a refrigerator compartment.
The Maybach 62 also includes an array of additional features such as Cockpit Management and Navigation System (COMAND), which includes DVD navigation, CD changer in rear seats, DVD players and TV tuners front and rear, two rear LCD TV screens including remote control and two sets of headphones, and automatic closing doors.

Even though the Maybach 62 has all these features included, optional extras were available. Some of these are a panoramic glass sunroof at a cost of $11,670, and an external communication system, and a loudspeaker and microphone system which allows the occupant in the rear of the Maybach to converse with people outside the car. This option came at a cost of $1,780. Additionally, a retractable electrotransparent partition screen between the driver and the rear occupants costs $23,780 and, most expensive, a high-protection GUARD B4 Package costs an additional $151,810.

Maybach 62 S 

The Maybach 62 S appeared in November 2000 at the Auto China 2000 exhibit in Beijing. It features the same engine as the 57S, a  twin-turbo V12 made by Mercedes-Benz AMG. However, the suspension remains untouched.

On February 26, 2019, North Korean's chairman Kim Jong-un came to visit Vietnam along with his cars such as a Maybach 62 S as well as a Mercedes S600 Pullman Guard.

Maybach 62 Landaulet 

The Maybach 62 Landaulet, based on the Maybach 62S, revives the classic landaulet car body style, which was popular in the 1920s and 30s. Powered by the 62S's  biturbo V12, the Landaulet's front seats are fully enclosed and separated from the rear passenger compartment by a power divider window; the opacity of this partition can be electronically controlled.

A sliding soft roof allows back-seat passengers to take in the sun from the comfort of their seats. The chauffeur's area is finished in black leather, while the rear is white with piano black- and gold-flecked black granite inserts.

Maybach publicly unveiled the Landaulet at the Middle East International Auto Show around the end of November 2007 as a concept car. Limited production was confirmed in January 2008. In total, 8 units were made, one of which was owned by rapper Birdman. DJ Khaled owns one as well and it has appeared in a few of his music videos. Also, Lee Kun-hee, former chairman of Samsung owns one as of 2011.

Maybach 57S Cruisero Coupe by Xenatec 

In 2010 German coachbuilder Xenatec unveiled the Maybach 57S Cruisero, a 2-door conversion of the Maybach 57S. The Cruisero has the same length, wheelbase and AMG V12 engine as the 57S it is based on. It is reported that the car was approved by Daimler and engineered to the same standard as other Maybachs. Only 8 cars were reportedly produced before Xenatec filed for bankruptcy. Cruisero car number 4 (as seen on the door sill) was listed for sale in early 2021 in the Netherlands with 2,200 kilometers for 795,000 euros (export price outside of the Netherlands).

Sales 

Initially, Daimler-Chrysler predicted annual sales of 2,000 global units with 50% coming from the United States; however, such lofty sales expectations never materialized. In 2007 Mercedes bought back 29 US dealers, reducing the total from 71 to 42.

2013 cessation 
With poor sales expectations and heavy impact of 2008 financial crises, Daimler AG undertook a review of the whole Maybach division. This included talks with Aston Martin to engineer and style the next generation of Maybach models along with the next generation of Lagonda models.

However, on 25 November 2011, Daimler announced that sales of all Maybach models and the brand would cease in 2013. Before the announcement, only 3000 Maybach vehicles had been sold, with estimated loss of €330,000 for each car sold.

The line was replaced by Mercedes-Benz S-Class Pullman models. An executive told a Frankfurt newspaper that: "(Daimler) came to the conclusion that the sales chances for the Mercedes brand were better than that of Maybach."

One suggestion for Maybach's struggles was that parent Daimler had failed to differentiate it from its Mercedes-Benz brand. While all three ultra-luxury brands share platforms and engines with other luxury brands from their parent auto company, Maybachs are built alongside the Mercedes-Benz S-Class flagship sedan, whereas Rolls-Royce and Bentley are assembled in England (separate from the rest of BMW and Volkswagen Group's production plants), and thus are regarded as being more "exclusive". Furthermore, the Maybach's pedigree was virtually unknown outside Germany, unlike its British rivals which have long enjoyed renown worldwide; indeed the 2006 Rolls-Royce Phantom's interior evokes memories of a 1930s car, while the Maybach 57S's inside makes no reference to its brand's history.

In October 2013, Top Gear magazine placed the Maybach 57 and 62 on its list of "The 13 worst cars of the last 20 years", commenting that "Mercedes-Benz decided to reactivate a brand that nobody under the age of 90 outside Stuttgart remembered, slathering an ersatz reject Hyundai luxury body over an ageing S-Class platform and hoping that various oligarchs, rap stars and Paris Hilton wouldn't notice that it was actually an elaborate con. They didn't. But we did. The 57S version finally gave the hapless guy up front something to do other than stirring up revolutionary resentment towards his boss, but by the time the Landaulet appeared, the game was up, and Mercedes iced the brand in favour of six different versions of the new S-Class. Smart move. Rolls-Royce, meanwhile, is on course for a record year in 2013."
  
In 2009 a 2004 Maybach 62 reached 999,999 kilometres, and continued providing service thereafter.

References

External links 

 Official website

57
Limousines
Flagship vehicles
Luxury vehicles
Cars introduced in 2002
Cars discontinued in 2012
2010s cars